The 2021 Wexford Senior Hurling Championship was the 111th staging of the Wexford Senior Hurling Championship since its establishment by the Wexford County Board in 1889. The championship began on 6 August 2021 and ended on 19 September 2021.

Shelmaliers entered the championship as the defending champions; however, they were beaten by St Anne's Rathangan at the semi-final stage. Crossabeg–Ballymurn joined the championship after gaining promotion from the intermediate grade. Oulart–The Ballagh and Fethard St Mogue's were relegated from the championship.

The final was played on 19 September 2021 at Chadwick's Wexford Park, between Rapparees and St Anne's Rathangan, in what was their first ever meeting in a final. Rapparees won the match by 6-18 to 1-18 to claim their second championship title overall and a first title since 1978.

St Anne's Rathangan player Diarmuid O'Keeffe was the championship's top scorer with 2-53.

Results

Group A

Group A table

Group A results

Group B

Group B table

Group B fixtures

Group C

Group C table

Group C fixtures

Group D

Group D table

Group D fixtures

Knockout stage

Preliminary quarter-finals

Relegation playoffs

Quarter-finals

Semi-finals

Final

Championship statistics

Top scorers

Overall

In a single game

References

Wexford Senior Hurling Championship
Wexford Senior Hurling Championship
Wexford Senior Hurling Championship